The Howlands Butte, elevation , is a minor butte in the southeast drainage of the very large Clear Creek drainage. Clear Creek is a medium length flowing creek, just upstream of the major Bright Angel Creek outfall into the Colorado River, Granite Gorge. The Howlands Butte was officially named in 1932 for brothers Seneca and Oramel G. Howland, members of the Powell Geographic Expedition of 1869. Just two days from the expedition's intended destination, the pair and William H. Dunn left the expedition, fearing they could not survive the dangers of the river much longer. They hiked out of the canyon and were never seen again. Separation Rapids on the river is where they departed from Powell.

Gallery

Geology

The geology of The Howlands Butte is relatively obvious, being that is a cliff-former massif of the Redwall Limestone. Interestingly, two rock units, commonly thin layers, are found, one on top of the Redwall platform (a cliff-former result of non-easily erodible rock), the other under the Redwall, on another platform, the Muav Limestone. The Surprise Canyon Formation is on top; the Temple Butte Limestone is below.

The prominence of The Howlands Butte is a remainder cliff (or shelf) of cliff-former, unit 2-of-4 Supai Group, the Manakacha Formation. It sits on slope-former Watahomigi Formation. And both Supai units sit on debris, and a remaining-layer of Surprise Canyon Formation.

The Tonto Group units are below, and then Basement rocks are found at Granite Gorge.

See also
 Geology of the Grand Canyon area
 Dunn Butte
 List of Supai Group prominences in the Grand Canyon

References

External links

 
 Top of The Howlands Butte, Grand Canyon, 2-18-1973

Grand Canyon
 Grand Canyon National Park
Landforms of Coconino County, Arizona
Mountains of Arizona
Mountains of Coconino County, Arizona
North American 1000 m summits